Pike Hill Signal Tower was one of a number of signal stations that were built on high ground overlooking the line of the Roman Stanegate road in northern Britannia during the early 2nd century. It later became incorporated into Hadrian's Wall. The tower is located between Turret 51B and Turret 52A with the fort of Banna located to the east.

History 
A signalling tower was built on Pike Hill during the Stanegate phase of fortifying the northern frontier of the Roman province of Britannia. Signalling towers and a number of forts were built along the line of the Roman road that connected significant military forts at Corbridge and Carlisle. This followed the withdrawal of the Roman army from Scotland around  100 and was prior to the construction of Hadrian's Wall which started in  125. The station at Pike Hill signalled to two nearby stations, Gillalees Beacon and Barrock Fell.

As Hadrian's Wall was extended through the area, the signal tower came to be incorporated alongside the newly constructed wall.

It has been suggested that the signal tower was manned by part of Milecastle 52's garrison.  The extra size of Milecastle 52 (20% larger than any other milecastle) has been cited as evidence for this.

Construction 
Archaeological investigations have shown that the tower was built prior to either the turf or stone walls that exist nearby. The tower was offset from the wall and stood at an angle of 45° to the line of the wall. The purpose of this was to improve the visibility of the signal. A ditch lies to the north of the tower, following the same course as the tower resulting in a zig-zag line.

The tower was built on a platform of mortared rubble and deep foundations have been found which indicate an upper structure of some extra height. The masonry was finished to a higher standard than the turrets found on the wall.

Excavations and investigations
1931 - The remains were excavated and consolidated. Finds included:
Pottery dating to the Hadrianic period;
Rims of cooking pots known as Huntcliff ware, indicating occupation as late as the latter half of the 4th century.
1971 - English Heritage Field Investigation.  It was noted that the modern road cutting has led to the destruction of the majority of the structure, only a fragment of the south-east wall remaining visible.

Monument records

References

External links
English Heritage

Buildings and structures completed in the 2nd century
Hadrian's Wall
Buildings and structures in Cumbria
English Heritage sites in Cumbria
Archaeological sites in Cumbria
Roman frontiers
Ruins in Cumbria